This is a list of music-related events in 1819.

Events
February 23 - Johann Nepomuk Hummel is appointed Kapellmeister to the Weimar court, where he would remain for the rest of his life.
 Breitkopf & Härtel publishes piano music by Maria Szymanowska.
Christoph Ernst Friedrich Weyse is appointed composer to the court of Denmark.
Franz Liszt plays for Carl Czerny for the first time. The latter is impressed and agrees to take him on as a pupil.

Classical music
Hector Berlioz – La Dépit de la bergère, H 7
João Domingos Bomtempo – Requiem in C Minor
Muzio Clementi – The publication of Gradus ad Parnassum Volume II is entered at Stationer's Hall, London on April 16.
Louis-Francois Dauprat – 3 Mélodies, Op. 25
Friedrich Ernst Fesca – String Quartet, Op. 12
Johann Nepomuk Hummel 
Piano Sonata No.5, Op. 81
Piano Trio in E major, Op. 83
Friedrich Kuhlau – 8 Variations on a Danish Song, Op. 16
Ignaz Moscheles – Grande Sonate, Op. 47
George Onslow – Violin Sonata No.4, Op. 15
Anton Reicha – Andante for Wind Quintet no 2 in F major
Andreas Romberg – Sinfonia alla turca, Op. 51
Franz Schubert – Trout Quintet
Maria Szymanowska 
Caprice sur la romance de Joconde
Grande valse
6 Minuets
Polonaise sur l'air national favori du feu Prince Joseph Poniatowsky
Carl Maria von Weber 
Rondo brillante, Op. 62
Polacca brillante, Op. 72

Opera
Saverio Mercadante – L'Apoteosi d'Ercole
Giovanni Pacini 
Il falegname di Livonia
La sposa fedele
Andreas Romberg – Die Großmut des Scipio
Gioachino Rossini
Bianca e Falliero
La donna del lago
Eduardo e Cristina
Ermione

Births
January 12 – Giovanni Guicciardi, Italian opera singer (d. 1883)
January 18 – Henriette Nissen-Saloman, opera singer (d. 1879)
February 11 – Samuel Parkman Tuckerman, composer (d. 1890)
February 24 – Emilia Uggla, pianist (d. 1855)
13 March – Henriette Wienecke, composer (d. 1907) 
April 4 – Lucile Grahn, ballerina (d. 1907)
April 7 – Hubert Léonard, composer and musician (died 1890) 
April 11 – Sir Charles Hallé, pianist and conductor (d. 1895)
April 18 – Franz von Suppé, composer (d. 1895)
May 3 – Nicola De Giosa, Italian composer (died 1885)
May 5
 Achille De Bassini, operatic baritone (d. 1881)
 Stanisław Moniuszko, composer, conductor and teacher (d. 1872)
May 13 – Henry Farmer, British composer (died 1891)
June 12 – Wilhelmina Fundin, Swedish operatic soprano (d. 1911) 
June 20 – Jacques Offenbach, composer  (d. 1880)
July 3 – Théodore Gouvy, composer (d. 1898)
July 26 – Justin Holland, classical guitarist and civil rights activist (d. 1887)
September 13 – Clara Schumann, pianist, composer (d. 1896)
September 15 – Jules Étienne Pasdeloup, composer and conductor (died 1887)
October 20 – Carl Mikuli, pianist, conductor, composer (d. 1897)
October 23 – Isaac Baker Woodbury, music collector and composer (died 1858)
date unknown – Ebba d'Aubert, Swedish pianist (d. 1860)

Deaths
March 9 – János Fusz, composer (b. 1777)
April 29 – Louis-Augustin Richer, classical singer, singing master and composer (b. 1740)
May 16 – Micaela Villegas, Peruvian entertainer (b. 1748)
June 20 – Maria Anna Braunhofer, operatic soprano (b. 1748)
June 21 – Georg Druschetzky, composer (b. 1745)
June 30 – Ernst Ludwig Gerber, composer and compiler of a dictionary of musicians (b. 1746)
September 7 – Jean-Louis Duport, cellist (b. 1749)
December 29 – Josepha Weber, operatic soprano (b. 1758)
date unknown – Anant Fandi, Marathi Shahir poet-singer (b. 1744)

References

 
19th century in music
Music by year